Chionanthus macrocarpus grows as a tree up to  tall, with a trunk diameter of up to . The flowers are white. The specific epithet macrocarpus is from the Greek meaning "large fruit". Habitat is mixed dipterocarp forest from sea-level to  altitude. C. macrocarpus is found in Sumatra, Peninsular Malaysia, Borneo and Java.

References

macrocarpus
Plants described in 1851
Trees of Sumatra
Trees of Peninsular Malaysia
Trees of Borneo
Trees of Java